Saša Peršon (born 28 February 1965 in Yugoslavia) is a Croatian retired footballer who played as a defender. At international level, he was capped 3 times for Croatia.

International career
Peršon made his debut for Croatia in an October 1990 friendly match against the United States and earned a total of 3 caps, scoring no goals. His final international was a June 1993 friendly against Ukraine. His first two games were unofficial though, as Croatia was still part of Yugoslavia at the time.

Career statistics

Club

International

Honours
Orijent
Croatian Republic League - West: 1983–84, 1984–85, 1985–86

Hajduk Split
Prva HNL: 1993–94, 1994–95
Croatian Cup: 1993, 1995
Croatian Super Cup: 1993

References

External links
 

1965 births
Living people
Footballers from Rijeka
Association football defenders
Yugoslav footballers
Croatian footballers
Croatia international footballers
HNK Orijent players
HNK Rijeka players
GNK Dinamo Zagreb players
HNK Hajduk Split players
AS Cannes players
Yugoslav First League players
Croatian Football League players
Ligue 1 players
Croatian expatriate footballers
Expatriate footballers in France
Croatian expatriate sportspeople in France